The following lists events that happened during 1927 in New Zealand.

Population
 Estimated population as of 31 December: 1,450,400
 Increase since previous 31 December 1926: 20,700 (1.45%)
 Males per 100 females: 104.3

Incumbents

Regal and viceregal
Head of state – George V
Governor-General – General Sir Charles Fergusson Bt GCMG KCB DSO MVO

Government
The 22nd New Zealand Parliament continued. Government was by the Reform Party with a strong majority, and with the Labour and Liberal parties in opposition.

Speaker of the House – Charles Statham (Independent)
Prime Minister – Gordon Coates (Reform)
Minister of Finance – William Downie Stewart (Reform)
Minister of Foreign Affairs – William Nosworthy (Reform)
Attorney-General – Frank Rolleston (Reform)
Chief Justice – Sir Charles Skerrett

Parliamentary opposition
 Leader of the Opposition – Harry Holland (Labour).

Main centre leaders
Mayor of Auckland – George Baildon
Mayor of Wellington – Charles Norwood, succeeded by George Troup
Mayor of Christchurch – John Archer
Mayor of Dunedin – Harold Tapley, succeeded by William Taverner

Events 
22 February – 22 March: Royal tour by the Duke and Duchess of York

Arts and literature

See 1927 in art, 1927 in literature, :Category:1927 books

Music

See: 1927 in music

Radio

See: Public broadcasting in New Zealand

Film
Carbine's Heritage
The Te Kooti Trail
Under the Southern Cross

See: :Category:1927 film awards, 1927 in film, List of New Zealand feature films, Cinema of New Zealand, :Category:1927 films

Sport

Badminton
The New Zealand Badminton Federation, now Badminton New Zealand, is founded and the first National Championships are held, at Wanganui.
Men's singles: R. Creed-Meredith
Women's singles: E. Hetley
Men's doubles: R. Creed-Meredith and M. Fell
Women's doubles: E. Hetley and N. Wanklyn
Mixed doubles: R. Creed-Meredith and E. Hetley

Chess
The 36th National Chess Championship was held in Auckland, and was won by A.W.O. Davies of Auckland, his third title.

Golf
 The 17th New Zealand Open championship was won by Ernie Moss.
 The 31st National Amateur Championships were held in Hamilton
 Men: Sloan Morpeth (Maungakiekie) – 2nd title
 Women: Mrs ? Collinson

Horse racing

Harness racing
 New Zealand Trotting Cup – Kohara
 Auckland Trotting Cup – Ahuriri

Thoroughbred racing
 New Zealand Cup – Rapier
 Avondale Gold Cup – Te Kara
 Auckland Cup – Rapier
 Wellington Cup – Rapier
 New Zealand Derby – Agrion

Lawn bowls
The national outdoor lawn bowls championships are held in Auckland.
 Men's singles champion – H.C. Clarke (Rocky Nook Bowling Club)
 Men's pair champions – A. Brakebush, M. Walker (skip) (Auckland Bowling Club)
 Men's fours champions – J. McMillan, H. Rowling, J.F. Wright, A.H. Benefield (skip) (St John's Bowling Club, Wanganui)

Rugby
 1926–27 New Zealand Māori rugby union tour
:Category:Rugby union in New Zealand :Category:All Blacks Ranfurly Shield

Rugby league
New Zealand national rugby league team

Soccer
 1927 Chatham Cup won by Ponsonby
 Canada toured New Zealand, playing a series of four internationals which they won 2–1.
 25 June, Dunedin: Draw 2–2
 2 July, Christchurch: NZ 1–2 Canada
 9 July, Wellington: NZ 1–0 Canada
 23 July, Auckland: NZ 1–4 Canada
 Provincial league champions:
	Auckland:	Thistle
	Canterbury:	Nomads
	Hawke's Bay:	Napier Rangers
	Nelson:	Athletic
	Otago:	Northern
	South Canterbury:	Rangers
	Southland:	Corinthians
	Taranaki:	Caledonian
	Waikato:	Waihou
	Wanganui:	Eastbrooke
	Wellington:	YMCA

Births

January
 4 January – Patrick Hanan, historian of Chinese literature
 7 January – Mary Batchelor, politician
 8 January – Sidney Moko Mead, anthropologist, historian, Māori leader
 9 January – Ken English, rugby league player
 11 January
 Johnny Hayes, cricketer
 John Tanner, rugby union player
 12 January
 Maurice Marshall, athlete
 Emily Schuster, master weaver
 14 January – Vera Burt, cricketer
 20 January – Cyril Paskell, rugby league player
 22 January – Jack Doms, swimmer

February
 2 February – Whatumoana Paki, Kīngitanga elder
 3 February – Graham Mexted, rugby union player
 6 February – Thomas Wells, cricketer, schoolteacher
 9 February – Walter Brown, actor
 12 February – John Todd, businessman, philanthropist
 18 February – Hugh Kawharu, academic, Ngāti Whātua leader
 20 February – Allan Wild, architect, academic
 27 February – Peter Whittle, mathematician, statistician

March
 2 March – Ray Farman, cricketer
 3 March – Bruce Tabb, accountancy academic
 9 March – Dave Leech, hammer thrower
 13 March
 Thea Muldoon, wife of Robert Muldoon
 Albert Putt, cricketer
 14 March – Tim Besley, civil engineer, businessman, public servant
 17 March – Christopher Small, sociomusicologist
 24 March – John Head, schoolteacher, anti-landmine campaigner
 31 March – Pat Hond, police officer, teacher, soldier, community worker

April
 5 April
 Neil Anderson, naval officer
 Eddie Robinson, rugby union player
 6 April – Barney Clarke, boxer
 9 April – Tiny Hill, rugby union player and selector
 13 April – George Chapman, accountant, businessman, politician
 14 April – Alan MacDiarmid, Nobel laureate chemist
 15 April – Joan Talbot, fashion designer and retailer
 18 April – Stanley Callagher, rowing coxswain
 20 April – Douglas J. Martin, Mormon leader
 21 April – Tom Logan, water polo player, swimmer, surf lifesaver, dentist, naval officer

May
 1 May 
 Pat Downey, lawyer and public servant
 Duncan McMullin, jurist
 8 May – Gray Nelson, public servant, diplomat
 9 May – Gerry Clark, sailor, writer and ornithologist
 17 May – Jacqueline Sturm, poet and short-story writer
 20 May – Donald Coleman, cricketer
 22 May – Eric Petrie, cricketer
 23 May – Jack Cropp, sailor
 25 May – Helen Smith, politician
 26 May – John Worrall, cricketer

June
 1 June – John O'Brien, rower
 4 June – William Fyfe, geochemist
 5 June – Bill McLennan, rugby league player
 8 June – Bob Walls, painter
 15 June – Roland Avery, rugby league referee
 16 June
 Kate Harcourt, actor
 Trevor Redmond, speedway rider
 20 June – Bill Bradfield, amateur astronomer
 27 June – Brian Brake, photographer

July
 9 July – Joyce Fenton, fencer
 10 July 
 Ken Deas, cricketer
 Peter Eastgate, rugby union player
 18 July
 Zin Harris, cricketer
 Jack Sutherland, athlete
 19 July – Ray Harper, rugby union player and administrator
 20 July – Tom Lynch, rugby union and rugby league player
 25 July
 James Belich, politician, mayor of Wellington
 Dorothy Fletcher, historian

August
 19 August – John Caselberg, writer
 25 August – Keith Cumberpatch, field hockey player
 26 August
 Jill Amos, local-body politician, community leader
 Bill McCaw, rugby union player
 30 August – Humphrey Gould, rower, businessman
 31 August – Reg King, association footballer

September
 1 September – Myra Larcombe, police officer, historian, and swimming coach
 9 September – John Hickman, meteorologist
 14 September – John Hall-Jones, historian, otolaryngologist
 22 September – Peter Burke, rugby union player, coach and administrator
 27 September – Te Uruhina McGarvey-Tiakiwai, Māori cultural leader

October
 9 October
 Bob Goslin, boxer
 Ron Trotter, businessman
 11 October – Leonard Watson, cricketer
 22 October – Wally Clark, zoologist
 24 October – Ian Monro, naval officer
 30 October – Jill McDonald, children's writer and illustrator

November
 7 November – Brian Finlay, rugby union player
 15 November – Wallace (Bill) Rowling, politician, 30th Prime Minister of New Zealand
 18 November
 Giovanni Cataldo, fisherman, search and rescue organiser
 Pat Creedy, rugby union and rugby league player
 19 November – Thomas Engel, rower
 21 November – Peter Mulgrew, mountaineer, sailor, businessman
 24 November
 Geoff Mardon, speedway rider
 Kevin Skinner, rugby union player
 25 November – Alison Preston-Thomas, netball player

December
 1 December – John Branthwaite, Anglican priest
 2 December – Les Hunter, politician
 4 December – Peter Hall, cricketer
 6 December – Alan Gilbertson, cricketer
 8 December
 David Hay, cardiologist, anti-smoking campaigner
 Hamish Hay, politician, mayor of Christchurch
 10 December – Graham Gordon, general practitioner and surgeon
 18 December – Rom Harré, philosopher, psychologist
 19 December – Robert Couper, cricketer
 23 December – Pat Sheahan, rugby union player, publican, publisher
 30 December – John Pring, rugby union referee

Exact date unknown
 Jim Edwards, politician
 Colin Franklin, electrical engineer
 Rusty Robertson, rowing coach
 Des White, rugby league player

Deaths

January–March
 4 January
 Herbert Drewitt, World War I flying ace (born 1895)
 Joseph Ward, astronomer (born 1862)
 13 January
 Frank S. Anthony, author (born 1891)
 John Fisher, politician (born 1837)
 21 January – Kiti Karaka Riwai, Māori tribal leader (born 1870)
 26 January – Robert Wellwood, farmer, auctioneer, commission agent, politician (born 1836)
 29 January – Sir Henry Brett, journalist, newspaper proprietor, writer, politician, mayor of Auckland (1877–78) (born 1843)
 21 February – Thomas Ryan, rugby union player, artist, steamer captain (born 1864)
 17 March – Bella MacCallum, botanist, mycologist (born 1886)
 26 March – Edward Withy, shipbuilder, politician (born 1844)
 31 March – David Guthrie, politician (born 1856)

April–June
 April – T. T. Rawhiti, Kīngitanga secretary and administrator
 4 April – Cuthbert Cowan, politician (born 1835)
 6 April – Elsie Reeve, jeweller (born 1885)
 8 April – John O'Donovan, police commissioner (born 1858)
 14 April – James Wilson, politician (born 1865)
 26 April – William Jolliffe, film censor (born 1851)
 28 April – Sarah Featon, botanical artist (born 1848)
 2 May – Eden George, photographer, politician, mayor of Christchurch (1892–93) (born 1863)
 1 June
 Thomas Andrew, cricketer (born 1927)
 Sir Worley Edwards, jurist (born 1850)
 11 June
 John Ormsby, land negotiator and commissioner, politician (born 1854)
 Hone Taare Tikao, Ngāi Tahu leader, scholar, politician (born 1850)
 17 June – Lake Ayson, acclimatisation officer, fisheries inspector (born 1855)

July–September
 18 July – Eustace Ferguson, pathologist, entomologist (born 1884)
 24 July – Arthur Harvey, doctor (born 1866)
 27 July – Newton King, auctioneer, merchant, businessman (born 1855)
 5 August – Thomas Groube, cricketer (born 1857)
 7 August – Frank Mace, soldier (born 1837)
 11 August – Edmond Slattery, swagger, rural labourer (born 1839)
 25 August – Richard Bollard, politician (born 1863)
 3 September – Bill Cunningham, rugby union player (born 1874)
 30 September – Edmund Taylor, temperance advocate, politician (born 1855)

October–December
 9 October – Charles Mules, Anglican bishop (born 1837)
 12 October – Louis Fowler, cricketer (born 1865)
 12 November – John Aris, cricketer (born 1843)
 17 November – Charlie Smyth, police officer, trade unionist, baker (born 1883)
 21 November – Oscar Alpers, journalist, poet, lawyer, jurist (born 1867)
 26 November – Percy Gates Morgan, geologist, science administrator (born 1867)
 28 November – Charles Lewis, politician (born 1857)
 8 December – Robert Allan, businessman, manufacturer (born 1847)
 18 December – Hugh Finn, politician (born 1847)

See also
History of New Zealand
List of years in New Zealand
Military history of New Zealand
Timeline of New Zealand history
Timeline of New Zealand's links with Antarctica
Timeline of the New Zealand environment

References

External links

 
Years of the 20th century in New Zealand